Physiotherapy: Theory and Practice is a peer-reviewed medical journal covering research in physiotherapy (physical therapy). It is published 8 times a year by Informa. The journal was established  in 1985 and the editor-in-chief is Scott Hasson (Georgia Health Sciences University).

Article types 
The journal publishes:
 Quantitative and qualitative research reports
 Theoretical papers
 Systematic literature reviews
 Clinical case reports
 Technical clinical notes

Abstracting and indexing 
The journal is abstracted and indexed in:

References

External links 
 

English-language journals
Physical therapy journals
Taylor & Francis academic journals
Publications established in 1985